A helium-3 refrigerator is a simple device used in experimental physics for obtaining temperatures down to about 0.2 kelvins.  By evaporative cooling of helium-4 (the more common isotope of helium), a 1-K pot liquefies a small amount of helium-3 in a small vessel called a helium-3 pot.  Evaporative cooling at low pressure of the liquid helium-3, usually driven by adsorption since due to its high price the helium-3 is usually contained in a closed system to avoid losses, cools the helium-3 pot to a fraction of a kelvin.

Use 
Helium-3 refrigerators are commonly used in particle accelerators to chill magnets.

See also
Dilution refrigerator

References

External links
 Helium-3 refrigerators at Caltech
Helium-3 refrigerators at Harvard

Cryogenics
Cooling technology